Sarah Kolasky is a Canadian actress and screenwriter. She is most noted for the film Great Great Great, which she starred in, coproduced and cowrote with Adam Garnet Jones. Jones and Kolasky received a Canadian Screen Award nomination for Best Original Screenplay at the 6th Canadian Screen Awards.

Filmography

Film

Television

References

External links

21st-century Canadian women writers
21st-century Canadian actresses
Canadian film actresses
Film producers from Ontario
Canadian women screenwriters
Canadian women film producers
Living people
21st-century Canadian screenwriters
Year of birth missing (living people)
Actresses from Toronto